René Descartes (1596–1650) was a French mathematician and philosopher.

Descartes or des Cartes or variant, may also refer to:

Places
 Descartes (crater), on the Moon
 Descartes, Indre-et-Loire, a commune of France
 Descartes Highlands, lunar landing site of Apollo 16

People with the surname
 Blanche Descartes, collaborative pseudonym for R. Leonard Brooks, Arthur Harold Stone, Cedric Smith, and W. T. Tutte
 Francine Descartes (1635–1640), René Descartes' daughter

Transportation and vehicles
 French frigate Descartes (1844–1867)
 French cruiser Descartes (1896–1920)
 René Descartes (ship), a cable-laying ship operated by France Télécom

Other uses
 Descartes (plotting tool), computer software
 Descartes Editeur, a French game publishing company
 University of Paris V: René Descartes, a university in Paris

See also

 Descartes number, a number that is "almost" a perfect number
 Descartes Prize, the European prize for excellence in scientific research and science communication
 Descartes' rule of signs, a mathematical technique devised by René Descartes that is used to find the number of positive, negative, and imaginary roots of a polynomial
 
 
 
 
 
 Cartesian (disambiguation)
 Cartes (disambiguation)
 Carte (disambiguation)
 Cart (disambiguation)
 DES (disambiguation)